KMVC (91.7 FM, "The V") is an American non-commercial educational radio station licensed to serve the community of Marshall, Missouri.  The station established in 1968 as "KNOS", is owned and operated by Missouri Valley College.

It broadcasts a college radio format.

The station was assigned the call sign "KMVC" by the U.S. Federal Communications Commission (FCC) on October 5, 1992.

References

External links
Missouri Valley College - Mass Communication

MVC
MVC
Radio stations established in 1968
Saline County, Missouri
1968 establishments in Missouri